The 2012 All Ireland Colleges Camogie Championship was won by Loreto, Kilkenny, who defeated St Brigids Loughrea by 4–11 to 1–10 in the final on March 3, 2012, at Templederry. It completed a three-in-a-row by the school, who also captured the junior title that year. They had10 of the 2011 winning team on their starting 15. Tracey Brennan was player of the match.

The final
Lydia Fitzpatrick's third goal for Loreto Kilkenny was described as reminiscent of John Fenton's memorable goal for Cork against Limerick in the 1987 Munster hurling semi-final:
Laura Porter's attempted clearance in the blink of an eye was blocked down, and Fitzpatrick almost unnoticed, pulled on the sliotar at 100 miles an hour and Lydia Fitzpatrick in an instant struck an unstoppable shot along the ground that flew aimlessly beyond the hapless goalkeeper Tara Murphy.

2012 Final

MATCH RULES
60 minutes
Extra Time if scores level
Maximum of 5 substitutions

References

External links
 Official Camogie Website

All-Ireland Colleges Camogie Championship
All-Ireland Colleges Camogie Championship